Yellott is a surname. Notable people with the surname include:

 Coleman Yellott (1821–1870), American politician
 George Yellott (1819–1902), American judge and poet
 John I. Yellott (1908–1986), American engineer known for solar energy research